William Phelps Allis (November 15, 1901 – March 5, 1999) was an American theoretical physicist specializing in electrical discharges in gases.  He was the grandson of Edward P. Allis, founder of the E.P. Allis Company, which became Allis-Chalmers.

Education

Allis majored in school and received his S.B. in 1923 and S.M. in 1924 from the Massachusetts Institute of Technology (MIT).  He was granted his Docteur ès science (Sc.D.) in physics, in 1925, from the University of Nancy, France.  From 1925 to 1929, he was a research associate at MIT.  It was there that he met Philip M. Morse.  Morse, at the suggestion of Karl T. Compton, made arrangements for postdoctoral studies and research with Arnold Sommerfeld at the Ludwig Maximilian University of Munich in 1930 and at the University of Cambridge in the spring and summer of 1931. Allis went with Morse to Munich and Cambridge.

Career

Upon his return from Europe, Allis was an instructor in physics at MIT from 1931 to 1934.  He joined MIT's physics department faculty in 1934 and was appointed full professor in 1950, a position he held until he became professor emeritus in 1967.

During World War II he worked at the MIT Radiation Laboratory conducting research on magnetron theory.  He then joined the United States Army where he served in the Liaison Office of the Naval Defense Research Committee. He also participated in Operation Alsos. He achieved the rank of lieutenant colonel, and was awarded the Legion of Merit in 1945.

Allis was one of co-founders of the  American Physical Society's Gaseous Electronics Conference, for which he served as chairman from 1949 to 1962.  On leave from MIT for two years, 1962–1964, he served as assistant secretary-general for scientific affairs for the North Atlantic Treaty Organization (NARUTO).

Allis directed Project Ashby, which was to determine the feasibility of building a nuclear fusion engine.

Honors
1945 – Awarded the Legion of Merit by the United States Army.
1951 Fellow of the American Academy of Arts and Sciences, also Vice President
Elected a Fellow of the American Physical Society

Books
William P. Allis Motions of ions and electrons [MIT Research Laboratory of Electronics. Technical report.] (MIT, 1951)
William P. Allis Electron density distribution in a high frequency discharge in the presence of plasma resonance [MIT Research Laboratory of Electronics. Technical report.] (MIT, 1951)
William P. Allis High-frequency electrical breakdown of gases [MIT Research Laboratory of Electronics. Technical report] (MIT, 1952)
William P. Allis and Melvin A. Herlin Thermodynamics and Statistical Mechanics (McGraw Hill, 1952)
W. P. Allis, "Motions of Ions and Electrons" in S. Flugge, editor "Handbuch der Physik" (Springer-Verlag, 1956, Berlin)
William P. Allis, editor Nuclear Fusion. (The Second Geneva Series on the Peaceful Uses of Atomic Energy) (Van Nostrand, 1960)
William P. Allis, Solomon J. Buchsbaum and Abraham Bers Waves in Anisotropic Plasmas MIT Press, 1962
Sanborn C. Brown, editor Electrons, Ions, and Waves: Selected Works of William Phelps Allis (MIT, 1967)
George Bekefi Principles of Laser Plasmas (John Wiley, 1976). Contribution by William P. Allis: The Application of Electron Upflux to the Calculation of Excitation Frequencies in Glow Discharges pp235–256.

References

 Philip M. Morse In at the Beginnings: A Physicists Life (MIT Press, second printing 1978)

Notes

External links

1901 births
1999 deaths
People from Menton
20th-century American physicists
French emigrants to the United States
MIT Department of Physics alumni
University of Lorraine alumni
Massachusetts Institute of Technology School of Science faculty
Fellows of the American Academy of Arts and Sciences
Recipients of the Legion of Merit
Nancy-Université alumni
United States Army colonels
Fellows of the American Physical Society
American expatriates in Germany